Lépine may refer to:

Places
Lépine, Pas-de-Calais
Lepine, Saskatchewan
Lepine, American Samoa

People
 Alfred Lépine (1901–1955), Canadian ice hockey player
 Ambroise-Dydime Lépine (1840–1923), Canadian aboriginal leader

 Hector Lepine (born 1897), Canadian ice hockey player
 Jean-Antoine Lépine (1720–1814), French clock- and watch-maker
 Louis Lépine (1846–1933), French lawyer, politician, and inventor who created the Concours Lépine.
 Marc Lépine (1964–1989), Canadian mass-murderer
 Nate Lepine, (born 1973), American musician, see Manishevitz
 Pete LePine (1876–1949), Canadian-born baseball player
 Raphaël Lépine (1840–1919), French physiologist and brother of Louis Lépine
 Stanislas Lépine (1835–1932), Russian-French painter
 Eddy De Lépine (born 1984), French sprinter
 René Lépine (1929–2012), Canadian businessman

See also
 Lepin, a surname
 L'Épine (disambiguation)
 Concours Lépine, a French annual contest for inventors
 Lepinja (plural on ), flatbread in Balkans